Gertrud Kantorowicz (1876-1945) was a German art historian, poet and translator.

Life
Gertrud Kantorowicz was born 1876 in Poznań. She studied in Berlin, becoming one of the first women in Germany to obtain a humanities PhD. She met Stefan George in 1898, becoming the only woman to publish in his literary magazine  ("Journal for the Arts"), and staying in close touch until 1914. Kantorowicz  also became a disciple and assistant to Georg Simmel, and his secret lover. In 1907 she bore Simmel a daughter, a fact hidden until after Simmel's death in 1918. Before the First World War she published a study on 15th century Sienese art, and a German translation of Henri Bergson's Creative Evolution.

In the mid-1920s she re-established contact with George. However, her work on the conceptual foundations of classical Greek art was only published posthumously. Although she was in England in 1938, she chose to return to Germany during the Czechoslovak crisis. After the outbreak of war, she managed to arrange a post at Skidmore College in the United States, but could not manage to leave Germany legally. Along with her aunt, the mother of Ernst Kantorowicz, she unsuccessfully tried to flee by crossing the border to Switzerland near Bregenz, was apprehended and sent to the Theresienstadt concentration camp. She died there in April 1945.

Works
 (ed.) Fragmente und Aufsätze: aus dem Nachlass und Veröffentlichungen der letzten Jahre [Fragments and essays: from notebooks and publications of recent years] by Georg Simmel
 Vom Wesen der griechischen Kunst [On the nature of Greek art], 1961. Translated into English by J. L. Benson as The inner nature of Greek art, 1992
 Lyrik: kritische Ausgabe [Lyrics: critical edition], ed. Philipp Redl, 2010.

References

Further reading
 Barbara Paul, 'Gertrud Kantorowicz (1876-1945): Kunstgeschichte als Lebenentwurf', in Hahn, ed., Frauen in den Kulturwissenschaften, pp. 96–109

1876 births
1942 deaths
German art historians
German poets
German women poets
Women art historians
German women historians
German people who died in the Theresienstadt Ghetto
People from Poznań